The Chilean Journal of Statistics is a biannual peer-reviewed scientific journal of statistics. It is published by the Chilean Statistical Society. The journal was established in 1984 as La Revista de la Sociedad Chilena de Estadística and obtained its current title in 2010.

Abstracting and indexing 
The Chilean Journal of Statistics is indexed in MathSciNet, Zentralblatt MATH, and  Latindex.

External links 
 
 Chilean Statistical Society (Sociedad Chilena de Estadística)

Statistics journals
Publications established in 1984
English-language journals
Biannual journals